Cynthia Jeanne Shaheen (née Bowers, born January 28, 1947) is an American retired educator and politician serving as the senior United States senator from New Hampshire since 2009. A member of the Democratic Party, Shaheen served as the 78th governor of New Hampshire from 1997 to 2003. She was the first woman elected governor of New Hampshire, the first woman elected to the Senate from New Hampshire, and the first woman elected as both a governor and a U.S. senator.

After serving two terms in the New Hampshire Senate, Shaheen was elected governor in 1996 and reelected in 1998 and 2000. In 2002, she unsuccessfully ran for U.S. Senate against Republican nominee John E. Sununu. She served as director of the Harvard Institute of Politics before resigning to run for the U.S. Senate again in the 2008 election, defeating Sununu in a rematch. She is the dean of New Hampshire's congressional delegation, serving in Congress since 2009.

Shaheen became the first Democratic senator from New Hampshire since John A. Durkin, who was defeated in 1980. In 2014, she became the second Democrat from New Hampshire to be reelected to the Senate and the first since Thomas J. McIntyre in 1972. She was reelected to a third term in 2020, defeating Republican nominee Bryant Messner.

Personal life, education and pre-political career
Jeanne Shaheen was born Cynthia Jeanne Bowers in St. Charles, Missouri, the daughter of Belle Ernestine (Stillings) and Ivan E. Bowers. She is a 12th-generation descendant of the prominent Native American Pocahontas. Her husband, Bill Shaheen, is a Lebanese-American attorney and judge. They have three children. She graduated from high school in Selinsgrove, Pennsylvania, and earned a bachelor's degree in English from Shippensburg University of Pennsylvania and a master's degree in political science from the University of Mississippi. She taught high school in Mississippi and moved to New Hampshire in 1973, where she taught school and, with her husband, owned a store that sold used jewelry.

Early political career
A Democrat, she worked on several campaigns, including Jimmy Carter's 1976 presidential campaign, and as the New Hampshire campaign manager for Gary Hart in 1984, before running for office in 1990, when she was elected to the state Senate for the 21st district. She was elected governor of New Hampshire in 1996 and reelected in 1998 and 2000.

In April 2005, Shaheen was named director of Harvard's Institute of Politics, succeeding former U.S. Representative and Secretary of Agriculture Dan Glickman.

Governor of New Hampshire
Shaheen's decision to run for New Hampshire governor followed the retirement of Republican Governor Steve Merrill. Her opponent in 1996 was Ovide M. Lamontagne, then chairman of the State Board of Education. Shaheen presented herself as a moderate. According to a PBS profile, she focused on education funding issues, and pledged to expand kindergarten. She defeated Lamontagne by 57 to 40 percent.

Shaheen was the first woman to be elected governor of New Hampshire. (She was not, however, the first woman to serve as New Hampshire's governor; Vesta M. Roy was acting governor from December 30, 1982, until January 6, 1983.)

In 1998, she was reelected by a margin of 66 to 31 percent.

In both 1996 and 1998, Shaheen took a no-new-taxes pledge. After a court decision preventing education from being largely supported by local taxes, "her administration devised a plan that would have increased education spending and set a statewide property tax."

Running for a third term in 2000, Shaheen refused to renew her no-new-taxes pledge, becoming the first New Hampshire governor in 38 years to win an election without making that pledge. Shaheen's preferred solution to the school-funding problem was not a broad-based tax but legalized video-gambling at state racetracks—a solution repeatedly rejected by the state legislature.

In 2001 Shaheen tried to implement a 2.5% sales tax, the first broad-based tariff of its kind in New Hampshire, which has never had a sales tax. The state legislature rejected her proposal. She also proposed an increase in the state's cigarette tax and a 4.5% capital gains tax.

Presidential politics

2000
During the 2000 Democratic presidential primary in New Hampshire, Shaheen supported Al Gore, and her husband served as Gore's New Hampshire campaign manager. According to the New York Observer, the Shaheens were critical in helping Gore win a narrow victory in the New Hampshire primary over Bill Bradley.

Gore added Shaheen to his short list of potential vice presidential nominees, which also included Indiana Senator Evan Bayh, North Carolina Senator John Edwards, House Minority Leader Dick Gephardt, Massachusetts Senator John Kerry, and Connecticut Senator Joe Lieberman. Shaheen responded to speculation by stating she wasn't interested in the job.

2004
After a short time teaching at Harvard University (and a fellowship in the Institute of Politics with former Massachusetts Governor Jane Swift), Shaheen was named national chairperson of John Kerry's 2004 presidential campaign in September 2003.

U.S. Senate

Elections

2002

After three two-year terms as governor, Shaheen declined to run for a fourth, instead choosing to run for the U.S. Senate in 2002. Republican John E. Sununu defeated her by a 51 percent to 47 percent margin (19,751 votes). In an interview with the Concord Monitor, Shaheen attributed her loss in part to "discussion about the job that [she] did as governor." At that time, early Republican advertisements slammed her support for putting a sales tax on the ballot or faulted her for failing schools.

In June 2004, former Republican consultant Allen Raymond pleaded guilty to jamming Democratic Party lines set up to get New Hampshire Democrats to the polls in 2002, which some (most notably former Senator Bob Smith, whom Sununu defeated in the Republican primary) believe contributed to Shaheen's loss. A judge sentenced Raymond to five months in jail in February 2005. Charles McGee, the former state GOP executive director, was sentenced to seven months for his role.

Raymond alleged that James Tobin, Northeast field director for the National Republican Senatorial Committee, masterminded the plot. In December 2005, Tobin was convicted of two federal felonies arising from the phone-jamming and sentenced to ten months in prison, but that conviction was reversed on appeal. In October 2008, prosecutors filed two new felony indictments charging that Tobin lied to an FBI agent when he was interviewed in 2003 about his role in the phone-jamming case. These charges were summarily dismissed in 2009 after the federal judge in Maine's District Court found them motivated by "vindictive prosecution".

It was the first time two candidates with Lebanese-American families, although Shaheen herself is not Lebanese-American, had squared off in a Senate race.

2008

In early July 2007 through UNH, CNN and WMUR put out a poll showing that Shaheen would beat Sununu in the 2008 Senate race (54–38). Other Democratic candidates did not have this type of lead, which led many to believe Shaheen would be the best choice to beat Sununu.

In April 2007, Shaheen met with Senate Majority Leader Harry Reid (D-Nevada) and Democratic Senatorial Campaign Committee Chairman Chuck Schumer (D-New York) about a Senate run. Both said she would have strong support from the DSCC if she ran. On September 14, 2007, Shaheen announced her candidacy. On September 15, she formally launched her campaign at her home in Madbury, New Hampshire. On September 21, EMILY's List endorsed her campaign.

Shaheen defeated Sununu 52% to 45% (44,535 votes).

2014

Shaheen ran for reelection in 2014, facing former Massachusetts Senator Scott Brown.

In March 2014, Brown announced he was forming an exploratory committee to run against Shaheen. According to the Boston Herald, "Granite State Republicans are calling U.S. Sen. Jeanne Shaheen a hypocrite for asking potential GOP challenger and former U.S. Sen. Scott Brown to keep "outside" money out of the campaign while she fills the Democratic war chest on the West Coast".

In June 2014, WMUR reported that Shaheen had never released her tax returns in her 18 years of public service in New Hampshire. Shaheen said she would not rule out releasing her returns, but would like to see her opponent do so first.

She was endorsed again by Emily's List.

On election night, even as her party lost control of the Senate, Shaheen won reelection with 51 percent of the vote to Brown's 48 percent. As a measure of how Republican New Hampshire once was, Shaheen is only the second Democrat in the state's history to win two terms in the Senate.

2020 

Shaheen was reelected in 2020 with 56.7% of the vote to Republican nominee Bryant “Corky” Messner's 40.9%. She is the first New Hampshire Democrat elected to three full terms in the Senate. The only other Democrat to be popularly elected more than once from New Hampshire, Thomas J. McIntyre (who held the seat Shaheen currently holds), served the remainder of Styles Bridges's last term before being elected to two terms in his own right.

Tenure

On January 6, 2009, Shaheen was sworn into the United States Senate. As a senator, she has sponsored 288 bills, five of which have become law.

On January 6, 2021, Shaheen was participating in the certification of the 2021 United States Electoral College vote count when Trump supporters attacked the U.S. Capitol. She tweeted during the attack that she and her staff were safe and that "We will not be stopped from doing our Constitutional duty". The day after the attack, Shaheen called Trump "unfit for office" and said that she supported impeaching him and removing him from office.

Health care

In 2009, Shaheen partnered with U.S. Senator Susan Collins to introduce the Medicare Transitional Care Act, which provides follow-up care for discharged hospital patients to reduce re-hospitalizations. The bill passed in 2010, and research at the University of Pennsylvania predicted the measure would lower the cost of health care by as much as $5,000 per Medicare beneficiary while also improving health care quality and reducing re-hospitalizations.

In December 2009, Shaheen voted for the Patient Protection and Affordable Care Act (PPACA; commonly called the Affordable Care Act or Obamacare).

In advance of the rollout of the PPACA, Shaheen said that people who liked their current health care plans could keep them. When asked about individuals who were losing their health care plans due to the PPACA, Shaheen said people could keep their health care plans if they were "willing to pay more."

In August 2019 Shaheen was one of 19 senators to sign a letter to United States Secretary of the Treasury Steve Mnuchin and United States Secretary of Health and Human Services Alex Azar requesting data from the Trump administration in order to help states and Congress understand the potential consequences of the Texas v. United States Affordable Care Act lawsuit, writing that an overhaul of the present health care system would form "an enormous hole in the pocketbooks of the people we serve as well as wreck state budgets".

In October 2019 Shaheen was one of 27 senators to sign a letter to Senate Majority Leader Mitch McConnell and Senate Minority Leader Chuck Schumer advocating the passage of the Community Health Investment, Modernization, and Excellence (CHIME) Act, which was set to expire the following month. The senators warned that if the funding for the Community Health Center Fund (CHCF) was allowed to expire, it "would cause an estimated 2,400 site closures, 47,000 lost jobs, and threaten the health care of approximately 9 million Americans."

Fiscal
On October 11, 2011, Shaheen voted to proceed with a proposed bill that included $446 billion in spending on infrastructure and schools and provided funding for state and local governments, as well as an extension of the payroll tax deduction. The spending would have been paid for by a 5.6% surtax on incomes above $1 million. The bill failed to obtain cloture.

Shaheen used an earmark in a large appropriations bill to restore funding for a federal prison in Berlin, NH, despite a $276 million recommended cut.

Gun policy
Shaheen supports making it illegal for individuals on the terrorist watchlist to buy guns and voted in favor of a bill proposing to expand background checks for gun purchases. She also voted to ban magazines of over 10 bullets. In 2016, she participated in the Chris Murphy gun control filibuster in the wake of the Orlando nightclub shooting. Shaheen said that "moments of sympathy are not enough" and that common-sense gun laws must be enacted.

Energy
Following the BP oil spill in the Gulf of Mexico in 2010, Shaheen proposed abolishing the Minerals Management Service, the U.S. government agency tasked with regulating offshore drilling, arguing that reform had been insufficient and that a new agency was needed. Shaheen also proposed legislation giving the president's bipartisan BP Oil Spill Commission subpoena power in its investigation. She argued that subpoena power was necessary to avoid another such disaster, emphasizing the spill's economic costs to the Gulf Coast region and the economy as a whole.

On April 28, 2014, Shaheen introduced the Energy Savings and Industrial Competitiveness Act of 2014 (S. 2262; 113th Congress), a bill intended to improve efficient energy use.

In March 2019 Shaheen was an original cosponsor of a bipartisan bill intended to mandate that the Environmental Protection Agency declare per- and polyfluoroalkyl substances as hazardous substances that can be addressed with cleanup funds via the EPA Superfund law and require that polluters undertake or pay for remediation within a year of the bill's enaction.

Shaheen opposed the Nord Stream 2, a pipeline for delivering natural gas from Russia to Germany.

Iraq War
In 2002, when Shaheen narrowly lost to Sununu, she supported both the 2003 invasion of Iraq and "regime change" for Iraq. Shaheen said that she came to supporting the policy of removing Saddam Hussein from power after meeting with former Clinton-administration National Security Advisor Sandy Berger. According to the Concord Monitor and Associated Press, the issue was a minor one in the race.

Shaheen later questioned George W. Bush's handling of the situation in Iraq. In a September 2004 televised interview as Kerry presidential campaign chair she said:

George [W.] Bush has taken us in the wrong direction. He misled us into war in Iraq. That war has not made us safer and more secure at home ... You know, we have not stabilized Afghanistan. We have not stabilized Iraq. There is no plan to win the peace.

On July 28, 2004, while serving as Chair of the Kerry-Edwards Campaign, Shaheen answered questions about her prior support of the Iraq war during an interview on C-SPAN.

War in Afghanistan

Shaheen opposed the 2021 withdrawal of U.S. troops from Afghanistan under President Joe Biden.

LGBT rights
Shaheen initially opposed same-sex marriage as governor of New Hampshire, but in 2009 she came out in favor of marriage for same-sex couples and sponsored the Respect for Marriage Act. She also voted in favor of the repeal of Don't ask, don't tell, and supports government recognition of same-sex spouses of military and other government personnel.

Minimum wage
On March 5, 2021, Shaheen voted against Bernie Sanders's amendment to include a $15/hour minimum wage in the American Rescue Plan Act of 2021.

Committee assignments

Committee on Appropriations
Subcommittee on Commerce, Justice, Science, and Related Agencies (Chair)
Subcommittee on Defense
Subcommittee on Energy and Water Development
Subcommittee on Homeland Security
Subcommittee on Labor, Health and Human Services, Education, and Related Agencies
Subcommittee on the Department of State, Foreign Operations, and Related Programs
Committee on Armed Services
Subcommittee on Emerging Threats and Capabilities
Subcommittee on Readiness and Management Support
Subcommittee on Seapower
Committee on Foreign Relations
Subcommittee on European Affairs
Subcommittee on International Operations and Organizations, Human Rights, Democracy and Global Women's Issues
Subcommittee on Near Eastern and South and Central Asian Affairs
Select Committee on Ethics
Commission on Security and Cooperation in Europe

Caucus memberships
 Afterschool Caucuses

Electoral history
Governor elections in New Hampshire: Results 1996–2000

*Write-in and minor candidate notes:  In 2002, write-ins received 197 votes.
Primaries

See also
 List of female governors in the United States
 Women in the United States Senate

References

External links

Senator Jeanne Shaheen official U.S. Senate website
Jeanne Shaheen for Senate

Profile at Harvard's Kennedy School of Government

|-

|-

|-

|-

|-

|-

1947 births
21st-century American politicians
21st-century American women politicians
American people of Powhatan descent
American Protestants
Democratic Party governors of New Hampshire
Democratic Party United States senators from New Hampshire
Female United States senators
Harvard University faculty
Living people
Democratic Party New Hampshire state senators
People from Mississippi
People from St. Charles, Missouri
People from Strafford County, New Hampshire
Shippensburg University of Pennsylvania alumni
2004 United States presidential electors
University of Mississippi alumni
Women in New Hampshire politics
Women state governors of the United States
American women academics
Rolfe family of Virginia
Bolling family of Virginia